Arthur John McMahon  (born February 24, 1946) is a former American football defensive back who played in the American Football League (AFL) and National Football League (NFL). He was drafted by the Boston Patriots in the 15th round of the 1968 NFL/AFL Draft as the 385th overall pick. He played college football at North Carolina State.

Born in Newark, New Jersey, McMahon grew up in Carteret, New Jersey and attended Carteret High School. A graduate in the class of 1964, McMahon is one of three Carteret alumni to play in the NFL, joining Stan Kosel (class of 1935) and Jason Worilds (class of 2006).

Professional career
McMahon was selected by the Boston Patriots in the 15th round (385th overall) of the 1968 NFL Draft. He played for the Boston Patriots in 1968 to 1970 and for the renamed New England Patriots in 1972. McMahon missed half of the 1970 season and all of 1971 due to injury.

References

1946 births
Living people
Carteret High School alumni
People from Carteret, New Jersey
Sportspeople from Union County, New Jersey
Players of American football from Newark, New Jersey
African-American players of American football
American football defensive backs
NC State Wolfpack football players
Boston Patriots players
New England Patriots players